Thomas Ruckle (1776–1853) was a house painter and sign painter in early nineteenth-century Baltimore, Maryland, and an amateur painter. He is best known for his paintings The Battle of North Point, and The Defense of Baltimore. Ruckle was a veteran of the War of 1812, in which he had served as a corporal in the 5th Maryland Regiment of the Maryland Militia.

Early life
Ruckle was born in Ireland and, having moved to Baltimore, Maryland, he became a sign painter and house painter. It is likely that he had very little, if any, formal training as an artist.

War of 1812
Ruckle fought in the Maryland Militia during the War of 1812, and took part in the Battle of North Point, during which the Maryland Militia under General John Stricker were able to hold up the British advance long enough to secure the successful defense of Baltimore.

Ruckle served as a Corporal  with the Washington Blues, a company of the 5th Maryland Regiment.

Ruckle's paintings The Battle of North Point, and The Defense of Baltimore were painted shortly after the events they describe, and are now in the collection of the Maryland Historical Society. The latter was included in an exhibit of American battle painting at the Museum of Modern Art in 1944.

Family life
Ruckle's son Thomas Coke Ruckle (1811–1891) was also a painter. He received a formal training in fine art at the Royal Academy in London from 1839 to 1841. On his return to Maryland he became a successful portrait painter, working out of a studio in Baltimore St. He also worked as an illustrator, creating a series of scenes of the American West, and also a number of drawings for a volume titled Early History of Methodism in Maryland, published in 1866.

See also
 Battle of North Point
 Battle of Baltimore

Notes

References
 Dean, Mary A. [and others] 350 Years of Art & Architecture in Maryland published by the University of Maryland, 1984.
 Pleasants, J. Hall. Two Hundred and Fifty Years of Painting in Maryland, published by the Baltimore Museum of Art, 1945.

External links
 page on Thomas Ruckle at findagrave Retrieved May 13, 2018 ccjr
 page on Thomas Ruckle at marylandartsource.org Retrieved Feb 17 2010
 Short page on Ruckle at rootsweb.ancestry.com Retrieved Feb 17 2010
 Link to Lithograph of Ruckle's painting of the Battle of North Point Retrieved Feb 17 2010
 Link to Ruckle's painting of the Defense of Baltimore Retrieved Dec 16 2015
 Thomas Ruckle at www.marylandartsource.org Retrieved Feb 17 2010
Register of the Military Order of Foreign Wars of the United States, National Commandery (1900) Retrieved Jan 14 2010

18th-century American painters
18th-century American male artists
American male painters
19th-century American painters
19th-century male artists
Artists from Baltimore
Maryland militia
Maryland in the War of 1812
Year of death missing
House painters
Painters from Maryland
American militiamen in the War of 1812
Irish emigrants to the United States (before 1923)
Year of birth unknown